Farmerstown is an unincorporated community in Clark Township, Holmes County, Ohio, United States. It lies along State Route 557.

References

Unincorporated communities in Holmes County, Ohio
Unincorporated communities in Ohio